This is a list of universities in the Isle of Man, a British Crown dependency.

Institutes of Higher Education 
 University College Isle of Man (an associate college of the University of Chester)

Centres of Higher Education 
 Centre for Manx Studies (part of the School of Archaeology, Classics and Egyptology in the University of Liverpool)

See also
 Isle of Man College
 List of schools in the Isle of Man

Universities
Man, Isle Of
Universities
Man, Isle Of
Universities